The , also known as the Ohama Goten Gardens, are a partially-preserved Edo period stroll garden situated a short distance to the north of Hikone Castle on the shore of Lake Biwa in Hikone, Shiga Prefecture, Japan. The gardens were laid out at his "lower" or suburban residence by daimyō  in Bunka 7 (1810), and have been designated a Place of Scenic Beauty, as well as forming part of Japan Heritage "Story" #008 Lake Biwa and Its Surroundings, and of the UNESCO World Heritage Site nomination Hikone Castle (currently on the Tentative List).

Description
During the Edo period, activities in the garden included tea ceremonies, as well as fishing nearby and horse-riding on the track immediately to the west. Remaining structures from the Edo period residence include the okuzashiki (inner room), storehouse, rice storehouse, kitchen building, and gatehouse. After the abolition of the han system in Meiji 4 (1871), the family had their principal residence in Tōkyō, but continued to visit Hikone. The residence - which came to be known as the  - was extended and the gardens renovated; the large hall and entrance building date from 1889. In 1947, the family moved back from Tōkyō, making this their principal residence. Lost structures include a teahouse, shoin, and gate.

See also

 List of Places of Scenic Beauty of Japan (Shiga)
 List of World Heritage Sites in Japan

References

Hikone, Shiga
Parks and gardens in Shiga Prefecture
Places of Scenic Beauty
Ii clan